His Lucky Day is a 1929 American comedy film directed by Edward F. Cline and written by John B. Hymer, Gladys Lehman and Albert DeMond. The film stars Reginald Denny, Lorayne Duval, Otis Harlan, Eddie Phillips, Cissy Fitzgerald and Harvey Clark. The film was released on June 2, 1929, by Universal Pictures.

Cast        
Reginald Denny as Charles Blaydon
Lorayne Duval as Kay Weaver
Otis Harlan as Jerome Van Dyne
Eddie Phillips as Spider
Cissy Fitzgerald as Mrs. Dan Dyne
Harvey Clark as Jerome Weaver
Tom O'Brien as James

References

External links
 

1929 films
1920s English-language films
American comedy films
1929 comedy films
Universal Pictures films
Films directed by Edward F. Cline
American black-and-white films
1920s American films